The 2016 Avispa Fukuoka season is the club's ninth season in the J1 League, they returned to the Japanese top flight after winning the 2015 J2 League playoffs. Avispa Fukuoka will also be competing in the J.League Cup and the Emperor's Cup.

Transfers

Winter

In:

Out:

Summer

In:

Out:

Squad

Pre-season

Competitions

Overall

Overview

{| class="wikitable" style="text-align: center"
|-
!rowspan=2|Competition
!colspan=8|Record
|-
!
!
!
!
!
!
!
!
|-
| J1 League

|-
| Emperor's Cup

|-
| J.League Cup

|-
! Total

J1 League

First stage

Results summary

Results by matchday

Matches

Second stage

Results summary

Results by matchday

Matches

Overall results

Emperor's Cup

J.League Cup

As a result of their promotion, Avispa Fukuoka would qualify in the 2016 J.League Cup. They were put in Group B alongside Yokohama F. Marinos, Kawasaki Frontale, Kashiwa Reysol, Vegalta Sendai, Albirex Niigata, and Sagan Tosu. Avispa Fukuoka recorded two wins and only one loss out of six matches, including a 1-0 away win versus Kawasaki Frontale and a 4-2 home win against Albirex Niigata, and thus qualified for the quarter-finals after finishing second on the table, much to the surprise of many as they were fighting in the relegation zone most of the time in their first season back in the top flight.

Group stage

Quarter-finals

Avispa Fukuoka were seeded against fourth-place finisher FC Tokyo, and would play their games on 31 August and 4 September. They drew the first leg 1-1 at Ajinomoto Stadium in Chōfu, but could not get a win on their second leg as they lost 0-2 in Hakata-ku, Fukuoka.

Statistics

Appearances and goals

Updated to matches played on 7 September 2016.

|-ENG
|colspan="14"|Players currently out on loan:

Cards

Accounts for all competitions. Updated to matches played on 7 September 2016.

References

External links
 Avispa Fukuoka official site
 J. League official site

Avispa Fukuoka
Avispa Fukuoka seasons